Saniorta is a rural locality (a selo) in Tokhotinsky Selsoviet, Tlyaratinsky District, Republic of Dagestan, Russia. The population was 288 as of 2010.

Geography 
Saniorta is located 20 km southeast of Tlyarata (the district's administrative centre) by road. Tokhota is the nearest rural locality.

References 

Rural localities in Tlyaratinsky District